Philotoceraeus visendus is a species of beetle in the family Cerambycidae. It was described by Léon Fairmaire in 1896.

References

Agapanthiini
Beetles described in 1896